"For Nancy ('Cos It Already Is)" is a song by American singer-songwriter Pete Yorn produced and mixed by Ken Andrews. It appears on his 2001 album Musicforthemorningafter and it was released as his first UK single. Some versions of the single feature an acoustic cover of "Panic" by The Smiths.  According to Yorn, the name of the song was inspired by a Les Paul Yorn bought at a second hand store.  After he got home from the store, he took a shower and had the guitar riff in his head.  After he got out, he grabbed his newly purchased guitar and started to play.  Unable to think of a name for the song, he glanced at the back of his pre-owned guitar and for the first time noticed the name "Nancy" scrawled into the back of it. (Anecdote retold by Yorn during a concert in 2003)

Track listing
 "For Nancy ('Cos It Already Is)" – album version
 "Black" – live version taken from Live at the Roxy
 "Panic" (Marr, Morrissey cover) / "Life on a Chain" – live version taken from Live at the Roxy
 "For Nancy ('Cos It Already Is)" – CD extra video

References

Pete Yorn songs
2001 singles
2001 songs